Magdalena is the original version of the given name Magdalene (the surname of Mary Magdalene), and is used in West Slavic (Czech, Polish, & Slovak), Hungarian, German, Lithuanian, Dutch, Swedish, Norwegian, Spanish, Georgian, and among other languages.

Notable persons with the name include:

Archduchess Magdalena of Austria (1532-1590), abbess
Magdalena Abakanowicz (1930—2017), Polish sculptor
Magdalena Aicega (born 1973), Argentinian field hockey player
Magdalena Álvarez (born 1952), Spanish politician
Magdalena Andersdotter (1590–1650), Norwegian shipowner
Magdalena Andersson (Moderate) (born 1954), Swedish politician
Magdalena Andersson, Swedish politician
Magdalena Avietėnaitė (1892–1984), Lithuanian journalist, diplomat and a public figure
Magdalena Barreiro, Ecuadoran Economy Minister and professor
Magdalena Bartoş (born 1954), Romanian fencer
Magdalena Hergert Becker (1878–1938), American pioneer missionary
Magdalena Białas (born 1962), Polish swimmer
Magdaléna Borová (born 1981), Czech actress
Magdalena Cielecka (born 1972), Polish film and theatre actress
Magdalena de la Cruz (1487–1560), Spanish nun
Magdalena Decilio (born 1983), Argentinian handball player
Magdalena Eriksson (born 1993), Swedish footballer
Magdalena Feistel (born 1970), Polish tennis player
Magdalena Forsberg (born 1967), Swedish cross country skier and biathlete
Magdalena Frackowiak (born 1984), Polish fashion model
Magdalena Fransson (born 1972), Swedish politician
Magdalena Fularczyk (born 1986), Polish rower
Magdalena Georgieva (born 1962), Bulgarian rower
Magdalena Graaf (born 1975), Swedish model, singer, and author
Magdalena Grzybowska (born 1978), Polish tennis player
Magdaléna Hajóssyová (born 1946), Slovak singer
Magdalena Sibylla of Hesse-Darmstadt (1652–1712), regent of the Duchy of Württemberg and German composer of baroque hymns
Magdalena Jalandoni (1891–1978), Filipino writer
Magdalena Kemnitz (born 1985), Polish rower
Magdalena Khristova (born 1977), Bulgarian athlete
Magdalena Kiszczyńska (born 1988), Polish tennis player
Magdalena Kochan (born 1950), Polish politician
Magdalena Kopp (1948–2015), German photographer and member of the Frankfurt Revolutionary Cells
Magdalena Kožená (born 1973), Czech singer
Magdalena Kozioł (born 1981), Polish judoka
Magdalena Krukowska, Polish sprint canoeist
Magdalena Kuras (born 1988), Swedish swimmer
Magdalena Lamparska (born 1988), Polish film and theater actress
Magdalena Leska (born 1984), Polish-American figure skater
Magdalena Lewy-Boulet (born 1973), American runner
Magdalena Luther (1529–1542), third child of German priest Martin Luther
Magdalena Maleeva (born 1975), Bulgarian tennis player
Magdalena Matte (born 1950), Chilean civil engineer, businesswoman and politician
Magdalena Mielcarz (born 1978), Polish actress and model
Magdalena Mikloş (born 1948), Romanian handball player
Magdalena Moons (1541–1613), famous for her role during the Dutch war of liberation
Magdalena Ortega de Nariño (1762–1811), wife of Antonio Nariño
Magdalena Sibylla of Neidschutz (1675–1694), German noblewoman and the mistress of John George IV, Elector of Saxony
Magdalena Neuner (born 1987), German biathlete
Magdalena Nieć, Polish actress
Magdalena Pajala (born 1988), Swedish cross country skier
Magdalena Paraschiv (born 1982), Romanian handball player
Magdalena van de Passe (1600–1638), Dutch engraver
Magdalena de Pazzi (1566–1607), Italian saint
Magdalena Petit (1903–1968), Chilean writer
Magdalena Dobromila Rettigová (1785–1845), Czech cookbook writer
Magdalena Rivas, American model
Magdalena Różczka (born 1978), Polish actress
Magdalena Rudenschöld (1766–1823), Swedish member of the nobility and a lady-in-waiting
Magdaléna Rybáriková (born 1988), Slovak tennis player
Magdalena Sadłecka (born 1982), Polish mountain biker
Magdalena Samozwaniec (1894–1972), Polish writer
Magdalena Sánchez (1915–2005), Venezuelan singer
Magdalena of Saxony (1507–1534), Margravine of Brandenburg, its "Electoral Princess"
Magdalena Schmidt (born 1949), German gymnast
Magdalena Schnurr (born 1992), German ski jumper
Magdalena Schröder (born 1990), Swedish politician
Magdalena Sibylle of Saxe-Weissenfels (1648–1681), German noblewoman
Magdalena Śliwa (born 1969), Polish volleyball player
Magdalena Solís, Mexican serial killer
Magdalena Sroczyńska, Polish pair skater
Magdalena Środa (born 1957), Polish philosopher, professor, author
Magdalena Stenbock (1649–1727), Politically active Swedish Noble (countess) and salon holder
Magdalena Stoffels (died 2017), Teenage schoolgirl who was murdered
Magdalena Streijffert (born 1977), Swedish politician
Magdalena of Sweden (1445–1495), Swedish princess, daughter of King Charles VIII of Sweden
Magdalena Titrici, Romanian chemist
Magdalena Tul (born 1980), Polish singer and composer
Magdalena Tulli (born 1955), Polish novelist
Magdalena of Valois (1443–1495), daughter of Charles VII of France and Marie of Anjou, and regent of Navarre
Magdaléna Vášáryová (born 1948), Slovak actress and diplomat
Magdalena Walach (born 1976), Polish film and theater actress
Magdalene of Waldeck-Wildungen (1558–1599), daughter of Philip IV of Waldeck-Wildungen
Magdalena Wójcik (born 1975), Polish singer and lead member of the Polish band Goya
Magdalena Wolińska-Riedi (born 1979), Polish-Vatican journalist
Magdalena Wilhelmine of Württemberg (1677–1742), margravine of Baden
Magdalena Wunderlich (born 1952), German slalom canoeist
Magdalena Zawadzka (born 1944), Polish stage and film actress
Princess Magdalena Reuss of Köstritz (1920–2009), wife of Prince Hubertus of Prussia

See also
 Anna Magdalena (given name)
 Magdalene (given name)

References

Bulgarian feminine given names
Czech feminine given names
German feminine given names
Lithuanian feminine given names
Macedonian feminine given names
Polish feminine given names
Romanian feminine given names
Serbian feminine given names
Slovak feminine given names
Spanish feminine given names
Swedish feminine given names
Swiss feminine given names